The Bremen Football Association, the BFV, is one of 21 state organisations of the German Football Association, the DFB, and covers the state of Bremen.

Overview

The BFV is also part of the Northern German Football Association, one of five regional federations in Germany. The other members of the regional association are the Hamburg Football Association, the Lower Saxony Football Association and the Schleswig-Holstein Football Association.

In 2017, the BFV had 44,066 members, 85 member clubs and 1,294 teams playing in its league system. It is the smallest of the 21 state associations in Germany.

References

External links
 DFB website  
 NFV website  
 BFV website 

Football in Bremen (state)
Football governing bodies in Germany
1946 establishments in Germany